Kingdom Bank Limited (Kenya), formerly Jamii Bora Bank, is a commercial bank in Kenya. It is one of the commercial banks licensed by the Central Bank of Kenya, the national banking regulator.

Location
The geographical coordinates of the bank's headquarters are:01°17'35.0"S, 36°47'23.0"E (Latitude:-1.293056; Longitude:36.789722).

History
The bank was founded, as a Charitable Trust, by fifty destitute families on the streets of Nairobi, Kenya's capital and largest city. In March 2010, it merged with another financial institution with a banking license and transformed into a fully fledged commercial bank. In March 2010, Jamii Bora merged with City Finance Bank (CFB), a small private financial services provider which, in the past, had provided services to large corporations and high-net-worth individuals. In the merger, CFB acquired JBB and took on the name of its new acquisition. Other investors in the bank include Baraka Africa Fund (BAF), and other individual investors. 

In March 2020, Co-operative Bank of Kenya, the country's fourth-largest commercial bank, with nearly 10 percent market share of national banking assets, proposed the acquisition of Jamii Bora Bank.

Assets
In March 2018, the bank's total assets were valued at approximately KSh12.5 billion (US$117 million).

Ownership
Jamii Bora Bank is privately owned. A rights issue of US$4 to 6 million was successfully executed in the 4th quarter of 2010. In November 2011, a new consortium known as Asterisk Holdings, invested KES:410 million (approx:US$4.6 million) in Jamii Bora Bank.
Following the acquisition of 90 percent shareholding in the stock of the bank by Cooperative bank of Kenya, the bank ownership was as depicted in the table below, as of August 2020.

Acquisition
In March 2020, Co-operative Bank of Kenya, the fourth-largest commercial bank in the country, began the process of acquiring 100 percent shareholding in Jamii Bora Bank. The process required regulatory approvals. On 7 August 2020, Cooperative Bank received all the necessary regulatory approvals to acquire 90 percent shareholding in Jami Bora Bank. On 25 August 2020, the bank re-branded to Kingdom Bank Kenya Limited.

Branches
, the bank maintained a network of branches at the following locations:

 Koinange Branch - Jamii Bora House, Muindi Mbingu Street, Nairobi
 Ongata Rongai Branch: Ongata Rongai, Nairobi
 Thika Branch: Kenyatta Avenue, Thika
 Kikuyu Branch: Brick House, Kikuyu
 Kisumu Branch: Mega Plaza, Oginga Odinga Street, Kisumu
 Kayole Branch: Kayole, Nairobi
 Nyeri Branch: Naivas Mall, Nyeri
 Mtwapa Branch - Mtwapa
 Mombasa Branch: Southern House, Moi Avenue, Mombasa
 Kawangware Branch: Mbugua Plaza Junction, Kawangware, Nairobi
 Kilimani Branch: Jamii Bora House, Argwings Kodhek Road, Nairobi 
 Kirinyaga Road Branch: Kirinyaga Road, Nairobi
 Kitengela Branch: Kitengela
 Kiambu Branch:  Kiambu
 Wangige Branch: Wanie, Kiambu County
 Utawala Branch: Utawala, Nairobi
 Nakuru Branch: Nakuru
 Kisii Branch: Kisii

Governance
The five-person board of directors is chaired by Margaret Karangatha. Other board members are Gideon Muriuki, the Cooperative Bank Group managing director, Macloud Malonza, Julius Sitienei and Anthony Mburu, the Kingdom Bank CEO.

See also
 List of banks in Kenya
 Central Bank of Kenya
 Economy of Kenya

References

External links
  Website of Kingdom Bank Limited
  Website of Jamii Bora Bank
 Website of Central Bank of Kenya
 Case Study of Jamii Bora Bank
 Jamii Bora Investors To Convert KSh400 Million Bonds Into Shares
 Jamii Bora Profit Jumps 129 Percent On Loan Book Growth
 The Resilience Of Kenyan Banking Sector

Banks of Kenya
Companies based in Nairobi
1999 establishments in Kenya
Banks established in 1999